The Time-Resolved Observations of Precipitation structure and storm Intensity with a Constellation of Smallsats (TROPICS) mission is a NASA constellation of six small satellites, 3U CubeSats, that will measure temperature and moisture profiles and precipitation in tropical systems with unprecedented temporal frequency. This data will enable scientists to study the dynamic processes that occur in the inner core of the storm resulting in rapid genesis and intensification. William Blackwell of the Massachusetts Institute of Technology's Lincoln Laboratory in Lexington, Massachusetts is the principal investigator. The constellation was initially planned to be delivered to orbit on three launches between June and July 2022; as of September 2022 no operational satellites have successfully reached orbit.

Mission overview 
TROPICS will perform very frequent measurements, similar to X-rays (but not actually observing X-rays), that cut through the overall cloud-cover to see the storm's underlying structure. The storm structures known as the eyewall – tall clouds, wind and rain around the eye – and rainbands – the rainy parts of the spiral arms – give clues about whether a storm is primed to intensify into a category 4 or 5 storm, something everyone in its path needs to know.

The CubeSats will be launched into three separate orbital planes to enable the overall constellation to monitor changes in tropical cyclones as frequently as every 21 minutes. Each CubeSat will host a high-performance radiometer scanning across the satellite track at 30 RPM to provide temperature profiles using seven channels near the 118.75 GHz oxygen absorption line, water vapor profiles using 3 channels near the 183 GHz water vapor absorption line, imagery in a single channel near 90 GHz for precipitation measurements, and a single channel at 206 GHz for cloud ice measurements. The investigation was selected from NASA's third Earth Venture Instrument competition.

Goddard Space Flight Center is the NASA Center leading the mission.

Launches 
The first launch took place on 12 June 2022. The Astra Rocket 3.3 vehicle (serial number LV0010) carrying two TROPICS CubeSats for TROPICS-1 mission failed to reach orbit and the satellites were lost. After Astra retiring their Rocket 3.3 on 4 August 2022, it was reported that NASA's intention was to wait for the upgraded Rocket 4 to be operational for the launch of the remaining four satellites of the constellation, meaning that they will be launched no earlier than 2023. However, it was reported at a smallsat conference on 8 August that NASA was "still looking for a ride". On 28 September 2022, NASA announced that the remaining satellites would be launched by a different launch provider prior to the 2023 hurricane season. On 23 November 2022, NASA awarded the launch of the remaining cubesats to Rocket Lab, with the launches to be performed by two Electron rockets starting in May 2023.

TROPICS Pathfinder CubeSat 
The TROPICS Pathfinder CubeSat mission, consisting of a single CubeSat, was approved by NASA's Earth System Science Pathfinder (ESSP) Program Office in order to demonstrate the technologies planned for use on TROPICS in advance of the constellation's launch.

TROPICS Pathfinder CubeSat was launched on 30 June 2021 via SpaceX's Transporter-2 rideshare mission on a Falcon 9 launch vehicle.

References 

Earth observation satellites of the United States
NASA satellites
Satellite launch failures
Satellite constellations
Spacecraft launched in 2022
2023 in spaceflight